Abyssomyces is a genus of fungi within the class Sordariomycetes. The relationship of this taxon to other taxa within the class is unknown (incertae sedis). This is a monotypic genus, containing the single species Abyssomyces hydrozoicus, found in Antarctica.

References

Fungi of Antarctica
Sordariomycetes enigmatic taxa
Monotypic Sordariomycetes genera